Knufia peltigerae is a species of fungus with unknown classification.

Synonym:
 Trichosphaeria peltigerae (= basionym) Fuckel, 1873

References

Ascomycota enigmatic taxa